Pseudophaio is a monotypic moth genus in the subfamily Arctiinae erected by George Hampson in 1914. Its single species, Pseudophaio rosenbergi, was first described by Rothschild in 1911. It is found in Ecuador.

References

Arctiinae